This is a list of sanghas in Central Valley, California, including the Sacramento metropolitan area.

List

References

Lists of Buddhist buildings and structures
Lists of religious buildings and structures in the United States